The Bucha massacre was the mass murder of Ukrainian civilians and prisoners of war by the Russian Armed Forces during the fight for and occupation of the city of Bucha as part of Russia's invasion of Ukraine. Photographic and video evidence of the massacre emerged on 1 April 2022 after Russian forces withdrew from the city.

According to local authorities, 458 bodies have been recovered from the town, including 9 children under the age of 18; among the victims, 419 people were killed by weapons and 39 appeared to have died of natural causes, possibly related to the occupation. The UN High Commissioner for Human Rights documented the unlawful killings, including summary executions, of at least 73 civilians in Bucha. Photos showed corpses of civilians, lined up with their hands bound behind their backs, shot at point-blank range, which ostensibly gave proof that summary executions had taken place. An inquiry by Radio Free Europe reported the use of a basement beneath a campground as a torture chamber. Many bodies were found mutilated and burnt, and girls as young as fourteen reported being raped by Russian soldiers. Ukraine has asked the International Criminal Court to investigate what happened in Bucha as part of its ongoing investigation of the invasion to determine whether a series of Russian war crimes or crimes against humanity were committed.

Russian authorities have denied responsibility and instead claimed that Ukraine faked footage of the event or staged the killings itself as a false flag operation, and have claimed that the footage and photographs of dead bodies were "fake news". These assertions by Russian authorities have been debunked as false by various groups and media organizations. Eyewitness accounts from residents of Bucha said that the Russian Armed Forces carried out the killings.

Background 

As part of the 2022 invasion of Ukraine, the Russian military entered Ukraine from the southern border of Belarus. One of the initial moves was a push towards the Ukrainian capital Kyiv, as part of which a huge column of military vehicles moved south towards Kyiv. On 27 February 2022, Russian advance forces moved into the city of Bucha, making it one of the first outlying areas of Kyiv taken by Russian forces. According to Ukrainian military intelligence, Russian forces occupying Bucha included the 64th Motor Rifle Brigade headed by Lieutenant Colonel Azatbek Omurbekov, under the 35th Combined Arms Army.

In late March, prior to the Russian retreat from Kyiv, Prosecutor General of Ukraine Iryna Venediktova stated that Ukrainian prosecutors had collected evidence of 2,500 suspected cases of war crimes committed by Russia during the invasion and had identified "several hundred suspects". Matilda Bogner, the head of the UN Human Rights Monitoring Mission in Ukraine, also raised concerns about the precise documentation of civilian casualties specifically in regions and cities under heavy fire, highlighting the lack of electricity and reliable communications.

Under attack by the Ukrainian military, Russian troops in the Bucha area retreated north as part of the general Russian retreat from the Kyiv area. Ukrainian forces entered Bucha on 1 April 2022.

Reports

During the Russian offensive 

According to The Kyiv Independent, on 4 March, Russian forces killed three unarmed Ukrainian civilians who were driving back from delivering food to a dog shelter. At around 7:15a.m. on 5 March, a pair of cars carrying two families trying to escape were spotted by Russian soldiers as the vehicles turned onto Chkalova Street. Russian forces opened fire on the convoy, killing a man in the second vehicle. The front car was hit by a burst of machine-gun fire, instantly killing two children and their mother.

The town's mayor, Anatoliy Fedoruk, had told media outlets about war crimes in the city prior to the town's recapture. On 7 March he had compared the situation in Bucha to a "nightmare" in an interview with the Associated Press, telling the reporters that "we can't even gather up the bodies because the shelling from heavy weapons doesn't stop day or night. Dogs are pulling apart the bodies on the city streets." In a 28 March interview with Adnkronos, Fedoruk said Russian forces were guilty of crimes against humanity. He evoked "a plan of terror against the civilian population" and claimed that "here in Bucha we see all the horrors we heard about as crimes committed by the Nazis during Second World War".

After the Russian withdrawal 

Following the Russian withdrawal, video footage was posted to social media on 1 April 2022, showing mass civilian casualties. According to Mayor Fedoruk, "hundreds of Russian soldiers" were also among the bodies found in the region. Subsequently, further evidence emerged which appeared to show war crimes committed by Russian forces while they occupied the region.

Soldiers of the Ukrainian Territorial Defense Forces said they had found eighteen mutilated bodies of men, women, and children in a summer camp's basement in Zabuchchya, near Bucha. One of the soldiers said that some of the bodies had cut-off ears or pulled out teeth and that the bodies had been removed a day before the interview.

Footage released by the Ukrainian army appeared to show a torture chamber in the basement. Corpses of other killed civilians were left on the road. A report by Radio Free Europe/Radio Liberty, an American state-funded media organization, described the basement as an "execution cellar" used by Russian forces.

A report published by The Kyiv Independent included a photo and information about one man and two or three naked women under a blanket whose bodies Russian soldiers tried to burn on the side of a road before fleeing. Ukrainian officials said the women had been raped and the bodies burnt. Journalists writing for The Kyiv Independent consider that photos indicated that Russian forces had singled out and killed Ukrainian civilian men in an organised fashion, with many bodies having been found with their hands tied behind their backs.

Many of the victims appeared to have been going about their daily routines, carrying shopping bags. Footage showed civilians dead with their hands bound. Other footage showed a dead man next to a bicycle. Journalists entering the city themselves discovered the bodies of more than a dozen people in civilian clothes.

CNN, the BBC, and AFP released video documentation of numerous dead bodies of civilians in the streets and yards in Bucha, some of them with tied arms or legs. BBC News said of the 20 bodies on the street, some had been shot in the temple and some bodies had been run over by a tank. On 2 April, an AFP reporter stated he had seen at least twenty bodies of male civilians lying in the streets of Bucha, with two of the bodies having tied hands. Fedoruk said that these individuals had all been shot in the back of the head.

On 5 April Associated Press journalists saw charred bodies on a residential street near a playground in Bucha, including one with a bullet hole in the skull, and a burned body of a child. On the same date, The Washington Post reported that Ukrainian investigators found evidence of torture, beheading, mutilation and incinerations of corpses. The body of at least one of those killed was turned into a trap and mined with tripwires. Villagers who were asked to help to identify a beheaded body related that drunken Russian soldiers told them of carrying out sadistic acts against Ukrainians.

By 9 April, Ukrainian forensic investigators had begun recovering bodies from mass graves, such as at the church of Andrew the Apostle.

On 21 April, Human Rights Watch published an extensive report that summarized their own investigation in Bucha, implicating Russian troops in summary executions, other unlawful killings, enforced disappearances, and torture. It also urged Ukrainian authorities to preserve evidence and cooperate with the International Criminal Court to bolster future war crime prosecutions.

Use of flechettes
By 24 April, The Guardian reported that dozens of bodies had flechettes in them. Unnamed eyewitnesses in Bucha had previously reported the firing of flechette rounds by Russian artillery, using shells that carry up to 8,000 flechettes each, according to The Guardian. The use of such indiscriminate weapons in areas with civilians is a violation of humanitarian law.

Testimony from residents 
Residents and the mayor of the city said that the victims had been killed by Russian troops. They indicated many of the survivors had been hiding from the Russians in basements, too scared to come out. Some of them had no light or electricity for weeks, using candles for heating water and cooking. They came out of hiding only when it was clear the Russians had left, welcoming the arrival of Ukrainian troops.

The BBC and The Guardian cited eyewitness accounts, from inhabitants of Bucha and the nearby villages of Obukhovychi and Ivankiv, of Russian troops using civilians as human shields as they came under attack by Ukrainian soldiers.

The Economist reported an account of a survivor of a mass execution. After getting trapped at a checkpoint when it came under fire from Russian artillery, the man was captured by Russian soldiers, along with the construction workers he was sheltering with at the checkpoint. The soldiers moved them to a nearby building being used as a Russian base, strip-searched them, beat and tortured them, then took them to the side of the building to shoot and kill them. The man was shot in the side, but survived by playing dead and later fleeing to a nearby home.

Residents, talking to Human Rights Watch (HRW) following the retreat of the Russian forces, described the treatment of people in the city during the occupation: Russian soldiers went door to door, questioning people, destroying their possessions, and looting their clothes to wear themselves. HRW heard reports that civilians were fired upon when leaving their homes for food and water, and would be ordered back into their homes by Russian troops, despite a lack of basic necessities such as water and heat due to the destruction of local infrastructure. There were also reported Russian armed vehicles would arbitrarily fire into buildings in the city and that Russian troops refused medical aid to injured civilians. A mass grave was dug for local victims, and the troops carried out extrajudicial executions. A HRW spokesperson said that it had documented at least one "unmistakable case" of summary execution by Russian soldiers on 4 March.

According to a report by The New York Times, Russian soldiers killed residents of the town "recklessly and sometimes sadistically" in a "campaign of terror". Russian snipers killed unsuspecting civilians. A Ukrainian woman was kidnapped by Russians, held in a cellar, repeatedly raped, and then executed. Another group of women and girls were locked in a basement for almost a month; nine of them subsequently became pregnant. Individuals with hands tied behind their back and executed were found throughout the town, indicating that several Russian military units carried out the murders.

According to a Kyiv resident, who was present at the Bucha headquarters of the territorial defence force, Russian soldiers checked documents and killed those who had participated in the war in the Donbas region of Ukraine. He said that Russian troops killed people with tattoos associated with right-wing groups, but also those with tattoos of Ukrainian symbols. According to his account, in the last week of the occupation, Kadyrovite Chechen fighters were shooting at every civilian they encountered. Another resident reported that Russian soldiers checked the cell phones of civilians for evidence of anti-Russian activity before taking them away or shooting them.

A witness told Radio Free Europe/Radio Liberty that the Russians "were killing people systematically. I personally heard how one sniper was boasting that he 'offed' two people he saw in apartment windows.... There was no need. There was no military justification to kill. It was just torturing civilians. On other blocks, people were really tortured. They were found with their hands tied behind their backs and shot in the back of the head." Locals asserted the killings were deliberate and many reported that in several instances snipers would gun down civilians for no clear reason.

Lyudmyla Denisova, Ukraine's human rights commissioner at the time, stated that sexual violence against civilians was weaponized by the Russian soldiers as part of what she referred to as "genocide of Ukrainian people". According to Denisova, as of 6 April 2022, a special telephone helpline had received at least 25 reports of rape of women and girls from Bucha, aged between 14 and 24.

Satellite images 

Russian claims that the bodies had been "staged" by the Ukrainian side after the withdrawal of Russian troops were contradicted by satellite images from mid-March that were provided by Maxar Technologies to The New York Times. The images of Yablonska Street show at least 11 "dark objects of similar size to a human body" appearing between 9 and 11 March. They appeared in precisely the same positions as bodies later filmed by a local council member on 1 April, after Ukrainian forces had reclaimed the city. Another video of the same street shows three bodies near bicycles and abandoned cars, which first appeared between 20 and 21 March according to satellite imagery. The Times concluded, on 4 April, that "many of the civilians were killed more than three weeks ago, when Russia's military was in control of the town" and that the images refute Russian claims of the contrary. BBC News came to the same conclusion.

The satellite images also showed the first signs of excavations for a mass grave in Bucha on 10 March. By 31 March, it had been expanded into an "approximately  trench in the southwestern section of the area near the church".

Video footage 
Video footage from a drone verified by The New York Times showed two Russian armoured vehicles firing at a civilian walking with a bicycle. A separate video, filmed after Russian withdrawal, showed a dead person wearing civilian clothing matching the drone footage, lying next to a bicycle.

On 19 May, The New York Times released videos showing Russian soldiers leading away a group of civilians, then forcing them to the ground. The dead bodies of the men were later recorded by a drone in the spot where the video was recorded and the bodies later found after Bucha's liberation. The videos clearly show the murdered men in Russian custody minutes before their execution and confirm eyewitness accounts. The troops responsible for the murders were Russian paratroopers.

Spatial distribution 
According to the Mayor Fedoruk, the highest rates of killings by Russian forces were in the Yablonska, Sklozavodska and Lisova Bucha parts of Bucha, and especially Yablunska and Vokzalna streets.

Reported death count 

Mayor Fedoruk said that at least 280 individuals from the city had to be buried in mass graves. Local residents had to bury another 57 bodies in another mass grave. Serhiy Kaplishny, a local coroner who fled but returned, said that as of 3 April, his team had collected more than 100 bodies during and after the fighting (including deaths of soldiers and deaths from natural causes).

He said that before leaving, he had hired a backhoe operator to dig a mass grave near the church, as the morgue was unable to refrigerate bodies due to the lack of electricity, and "It was a horror". He also said that since returning, he had picked up 13 bodies of civilians who had had their arms tied and been shot at close range.

As of 4 April, the exact number of people killed was still unknown. Fedoruk said at least 300 people had been found dead in the immediate aftermath of the massacre. In an interview with Reuters, deputy mayor Taras Shapravskyi said 50 of the victims had been extrajudicially executed. The figure of 300 was later revised to 403 on 12 April.

Defence Minister Oleksii Reznikov said, "In Bucha alone the death toll is already higher than in Vukovar", referring to the killing of hundreds of Croat civilians and prisoners of war during the Croatian War of Independence. On 13 April 2022, BBC News posted an article saying "at least 500 dead have been found since the Russians left" Bucha. On 16 May 2022, BBC News reported that more than 1,000 civilians were killed in the Bucha region during the month under Russian occupation, but most did not die from shrapnel or shelling. More than 650 were shot dead by Russian soldiers.

As of 13 June 2022, Ukrainian authorities said that 1,316 bodies had been uncovered in Kyiv Oblast including Bucha since the Russian withdrawal. The same day seven more victims were also recovered from a forest grave. Two of them had their hands tied behind the back and had gunshot wounds to the knees, which local police said indicated torture.

On 29 June the UN High Commissioner for Human Rights documented the unlawful killings, including summary executions, of at least 50 civilians in Bucha. The human rights agency also verified that at least 482 residential buildings had been damaged or destroyed in the towns of Bucha, Irpin and Hostomel between 24 February and 31 March. In December 2022 the number was updated to at least 73 with an additional 105 deaths being investigated.

On 8 August 2022, officials released a count of civilian deaths in the town of Bucha alone: 458 bodies, 419 with signs of shooting, torture, or violent trauma, and 39 apparently of natural causes but being scrutinized for their relationship to the Russian occupation. 366 were male, 86 female, and five of indiscernible gender due to their condition. Nine were children. 50 bodies remained unidentified, along with body parts and ash.

Notable victims 
Vitaly Vinogradov, the Academic Dean of the Kyiv Slavic Evangelical Seminary, was among the dead in Bucha. The body of Zoreslav Zamoysky, a local freelance journalist, was also found in Bucha, and was subsequently buried in the village of Barakhty. Businessman and former 2004 Ukrainian presidential election candidate Oleksandr Rzhavskyy was killed in Bucha at his estate. Rzhavskyy was previously noted to be a pro-Russian politician, criticized the post-2014 Ukrainian government and praised Vladimir Putin. According to his daughter, he had been abducted twice by Russian soldiers at his estate who had demanded a ransom, and during a drunken binge, the Russian soldiers shot him dead.

Russian units involved 
Ukrainian activists said that the 64th Separate Motorised Rifle Brigade, a motorized infantry brigade part of the Eastern Military District's 35th Army, was occupying Bucha while the atrocities took place. In addition, two units of Kadyrovite Chechens, one from the Special Rapid Response Force (SOBR) and another paramilitary riot-control force known as OMON, were involved in the military occupation of Bucha and nearby villages.

Various Ukrainian groups used open intelligence sources to identify the 64th Motor Rifle Brigade, unit 51460, as part of the occupation forces, in an effort to track down those responsible. Ukrainian media published the names of Russian soldiers they alleged were based at Bucha during the occupation. Ukrayinska Pravda, quoting the Ukrainian Intelligence Directorate, said that the 64th Motorised Rifle Brigade was pulled out of the area, with the intention of returning to Ukraine in the Kharkiv front.

On 6 April 2022, CNN cited an unnamed US official as saying that identification of the Russian units involved in the Bucha atrocities was "an extremely high priority" for the US intelligence agencies, which had been using all available tools and assets in their work and were at the point of "narrowing down" responsibility.

According to a report from Der Spiegel, the German Federal Intelligence Service (BND) briefed parliamentarians on 6 April 2022 about radio intercepts of Russian soldiers in the area north of Kyiv, linking them to specific atrocities in Bucha. According to the report, the BND provided evidence that an airborne regiment and an army unit were initially responsible for the crimes, and that the Wagner Group later played a leading role in the atrocities. The BND said that the killings were not considered exceptional by the soldiers discussing them, and, according to sources familiar with the intercepts, that the atrocities had become a standard element of Russian military activity.

The New York Times reported on 19 May 2022 that documents recovered where Ukrainian men were executed belonged to the 104th Guards Air Assault Regiment (Unit 32515) and Unit 74268 of the 234th Guards Air Assault Regiment.

Investigation of Associated Press revealed that 76th Guards Air Assault Division was running the Russian occupation headquarters at the 144 Yablunska street from where the cleansing operation of Bucha was coordinated. Ukrainian prosecutors are pursuing the commander, Maj. Gen. Sergei Chubarykin, and his boss, Col. Gen. Alexander Chaiko for the operation.

Investigations

Ukraine 
The National Police of Ukraine opened investigations into events in Bucha, with the broad area treated as a crime scene. At the same time, the Foreign Ministry requested the International Criminal Court investigation in Ukraine to send investigators to Bucha and other areas of Kyiv Oblast. Foreign Minister Dmytro Kuleba also called on other international groups to collect evidence.

Russia 
Russia requested a special meeting of the United Nations Security Council, on which it is one of five permanent members, to address what it called a "heinous provocation of Ukrainian radicals", the footage of dead bodies in Bucha, which it said was staged. Alexander Bastrykin, head of the Investigative Committee of Russia, ordered an investigation into what he labelled a "Ukrainian provocation", accusing Ukrainian authorities of spreading "deliberately false information" about the actions of the Russian armed forces.

Amnesty International 

On 6 May 2022, Amnesty International published the results of the investigation of the massacre in their report. It concluded that Russian forces were guilty of unlawful attacks and willful killings of civilians in Bucha, Andriivka, Zdvyzhivka and Vorzel. In Bucha alone, 22 different cases of killings by Russian forces were confirmed. Amnesty International called on ICC to bring the perpetrators to justice:

The New York Times 
On 22 December 2022, The New York Times published the results of the investigation of the massacre in their report. The eight-month visual investigation by the paper concluded that the perpetrators of the massacre along Yablunska Street were Russian paratroopers from the 234th Air Assault Regiment (the part of 76th Guards Air Assault Division) led by Lt. Col. Artyom Gorodilov.

Reactions

Ukraine 

Foreign Minister Dmytro Kuleba described the events as a "deliberate massacre". He said Russia was "worse than ISIS" and that Russian forces were guilty of murder, torture, rape and looting. Kuleba also urged the G7 countries to impose "devastating" additional sanctions.

In an interview with Bild, Mayor of Kyiv Vitali Klitschko said that "what happened in Bucha and other suburbs of Kyiv can only be described as genocide" and accused Russian President Vladimir Putin of war crimes. President Zelenskyy visited the area on 4 April 2022, to show reporters and the world the reported atrocities in Bucha.

Speaking to the United Nations Security Council on 5 April, Zelenskyy said that the massacre was "unfortunately only one example of what the occupiers have been doing on our territory for the past 41 days", and that Russian forces used tanks to crush Ukrainian civilians in cars "for pleasure". He called for Russia to be held accountable for the actions of its military, and lose its position on the Security Council.

International organisations 

The massacre was condemned by the president of the EU Council, Charles Michel, who said he was "shocked by haunting images of atrocities committed by Russian army in Kyiv" and promised the EU would assist Ukraine and human rights groups in collecting evidence for use in international courts. NATO Secretary General Jens Stoltenberg similarly expressed his horror at the targeting of civilians.

United Nations Secretary-General António Guterres expressed his shock at the images and called for an independent investigation that would ensure effective accountability. The UN Security Council convened on 5 April to discuss the situation, including a video address from President Zelenskyy.

On 7 April, the United States initiated a resolution at the emergency special session of the UN General Assembly to suspend Russia from the Human Rights Council, the UN's leading human rights body. The resolution passed, with 93 countries voting for the proposal, 24 against, and 58 abstaining. Russia is the second country to have its membership rights revoked at the council, after Libya in 2011, and the only permanent member of the Security Council to have its rights revoked.

Foreign ministers from the G7 issued a joint statement condemning the "atrocities" committed by Russia in Bucha and other parts of Ukraine.

European Commission President Ursula von der Leyen visited Bucha on 8 April viewing mass graves and describing the massacre as "the cruel face of Putin's army". Von der Leyen later visited Kyiv and met with President Zelenskyy, presenting Zelenskyy with paperwork to begin the process of Ukraine's accession to the European Union and offering to fast-track Ukraine's application.

Other countries 
Leaders of neighbouring and nearby European countries condemned the attack and called for investigations into the atrocities committed. Estonian Prime Minister Kaja Kallas compared the images of the event to those from mass killings committed by the Soviet Union and Nazi Germany, and called for details to be gathered and perpetrators brought to court, while Slovak Prime Minister Eduard Heger compared the massacre with the "apocalypse of war in former Yugoslavia". Moldovan President Maia Sandu called the event "crimes against humanity" and declared 4 April 2022 a day of national mourning in memory of all Ukrainians killed in the Russo-Ukrainian war. Amongst Ukraine and Russia's other neighbours, such condemnations were also expressed by political leaders in Finland, Lithuania, Poland, and Turkey.

The events led to numerous European Union membersincluding Denmark, Estonia, France, Germany, Greece, Italy, Latvia, Lithuania, Portugal, Romania, Slovenia, Spain and Swedenordering the expulsion of more than 200 Russian diplomats in total from their countries. Such expulsions were also enacted by Japan.

Chinese state media claimed that Ukraine staged the incident, repeated Russian claims against responsibility and claimed the United States was responsible for the war. Representatives of China and India to the UN Security Council described the reports as "deeply disturbing" and backed calls for international investigations. In China, such reactions were also echoed at a press briefing for the Ministry of Foreign Affairs, although blame for the incident was not directly attributed to any of the involved actors. This refusal to assign blame was followed by the repetition in Chinese state media of Russian claims disputing the veracity of the events. Putin's ally, Belarusian president Alexander Lukashenko, also called the Bucha massacre a "false flag attack" and a "psychological operation" orchestrated by British operatives in order to introduce new sanctions against Russia, and purportedly gave Putin documents relating to these allegations. The Cuban state newspaper Granma also claimed that the incident was staged, reporting that the images from Bucha "distort reality and give the world an unreal version of what happened, after the abandonment of Russian troops", while Telesur, owned and operated by the governments of Cuba, Nicaragua and Venezuela, described the massacre as "a fake news story".

US President Joe Biden called for Putin to be tried for war crimes. Biden also stated that he supported additional sanctions on Russia. A similar sentiment was shared by British prime minister Boris Johnson, who said that economic sanctions and military support for Ukraine would be stepped up as a result.

French President Emmanuel Macron described the actions of the Russian military as amounting to war crimes and that new sanctions were necessary in response. Macron suggested targeting the Russian oil and coal industries. Subsequently, the European Union announced additional sanctions against Russia including a ban on imports of coal, wood, rubber, cement, fertilisers and other products from Russia. The ban on coal imports was expected to cost Russia €8 billion annually. The additional sanctions also included export bans on high-tech equipment and technology from Europe. In announcing the sanctions Josep Borrell stated that they were adopted "following the atrocities committed by Russian armed forces in Bucha".

Russian response and denial 

 
Russian Foreign Minister Sergey Lavrov called the massacre a "fake attack" used against Russia, claiming it had been staged. He said that Russian forces had left Bucha on 30 March while evidence of killings had emerged, according to him, four days later, following the arrival in Bucha of Ukrainian security service, and claimed that on 31 March Bucha's Mayor Anatoly Fedoruk had released a video message stating that the Russian army had left the city without mentioning any locals shot in the streets. Associated Press reported that Mayor Fedoruk did give his account about "dead bodies piling up in Bucha" on 7 March.

On 4 April, at the United Nations, the Russian representative Vasily Nebenzya said that the bodies in the videos were not there before the Russian forces withdrew from Bucha. This was contradicted by satellite images which showed that the bodies were there as early as 19 March; the position of the corpses in the satellite images match the smartphone photos taken in early April.

The Russian Defence Ministry's Telegram channel reposted a report stating Russian forces had not targeted civilians during the battle. According to the statement, a massacre could not have been covered up by the Russian military, and the mass grave in the city was filled with victims of Ukrainian airstrikes. The Ministry said it had analyzed a video purporting to show the bodies of dead civilians in Bucha, and said the corpses filmed were moving. This claim was investigated by the BBC's Moscow Department, which concluded there was no evidence the video had been staged.

Bellingcat favourably cited the BBC's account and further put into question the timeline presented by Russian government sources. In particular, Bellingcat journalist and founder Eliot Higgins noted that both the Russian media outlet TV Zvezda and the secretary of the Bucha City Council Taras Shapravsky reported that Russian forces were still present in Bucha at least as late as 1 April.

Another attempt to depict the incident as a fake aired on Russian state television channel Russia-24, using a video which the channel claimed to show Ukrainians arranging mannequins in order to "stage" the Bucha massacre. The footage was quickly identified as coming from a television set filmed in Saint Petersburg. Workers for the television show confirmed that the video was from a Russian television show. Similarly, a video showing Ukrainian soldiers pulling dead bodies with cables in Bucha was widely shared by pro-Russian social media, supposedly to prove that the scene was staged. The provenance of the video is Associated Press; its report explains that the use of cables was due to concern of the dead bodies being possibly booby-trapped.

Russian President Vladimir Putin and Belarusian President Alexander Lukashenko called the mass killing of civilians in Bucha "fake".

In an article for The Conversation, journalist Tomas Sniegon described Russia's approach to Bucha as similar as the Soviet Union's denial of the Katyn massacre, in which Soviet troops covered up the execution of thousands of Poles, insisting the massacre had been done by the German army. Comparisons between the two events were also made by The Asahi Shimbun and Prime Minister of Slovenia Janez Janša.

Russian Permanent Representative to the United Nations Vassily Nebenzya claimed that Western media "suppressed all objective facts and evidence and disseminated blatant fakes instead" and implied that the Guardian report proves that the Ukrainian army was responsible for the killings.

Censorship in Russia 
Russian journalist , former publisher of independent news site Meduza, was charged under Russia's 2022 war censorship laws for condemning the Russian military for the Bucha massacre.

Sergei Klokov, a driver for Moscow's police headquarters with Ukrainian roots, who is originally from Bucha, was arrested after he told colleagues what he had heard from his father and Ukrainian family friends about the Russian invasion. Among Klokov's alleged crimes was saying that Russian soldiers were killing Ukrainian civilians.

Russian television presenter and singer Maxim Galkin accused the Russian authorities of hypocrisy and lies regarding war crimes committed by Russian soldiers in Bucha. 

On 9 December 2022, a Moscow court sentenced Russian opposition politician Ilya Yashin to eight years and six months imprisonment for his statements about the circumstances of the killings in Bucha on charges of "spreading false information" about the armed forces. Yashin condemned the killings and said that Russian forces in Ukraine were responsible for the massacre. His punishment was the harshest given under the new laws which criminalize spreading "false" information about the armed forces.

Social media comments 

An analysis of three Russian nationalist Telegram channels with tens of thousands of subscribers responding to the news of the massacre breaking reported that, 144 comments –almost half– made within the first 48 hours demanded that Russian forces act even more violently. Many of the comments included racially motivated calls for violence against Ukrainians, many of them advocating genocide. According to the study, "messages combined religious references with extreme homophobia, overt racism, calls for violence, and descriptions of the Ukrainian other as diseased". Between the time when the news of the massacre came out and late April, the comments in the nationalist Telegram channels have gotten even more extreme in their calls for more sadistic violence from Russian troops, including exhortations to mass rape, prostituting of Ukrainian POWs and mass murder. Popular Odessa-born Russian "activist-journalist" and moderator of one of the channels, Yuliya Vityazeva, compared Ukrainian defenders of Mariupol to "cockroaches" and stated that gassing them was unnecessary since there were "simpler and cheaper" ways to murder them, a type of comment that resembled narratives observed in the run up to the Rwandan genocide.

The Telegram channels have also been used to sell t-shirts with the letters "V" and "Z" and the slogan "Slaughter in Bucha: We Can Do It Again."

See also 

 Babi Yar
 Claims of genocide of Ukrainians in the 2022 Russian invasion of Ukraine
 Izium mass graves
 List of massacres in Ukraine
 Novye Aldi massacre
 Sexual violence in the Russian invasion of Ukraine (2022–present)
 State terrorism

Notes and references

Notes

References

Further reading

External links 

 Video: Exposing the Russian Military Unit Behind a Massacre in Bucha | Visual Investigations by The New York Times

21st-century mass murder in Ukraine
Massacre
Genocide and the 2022 Russian invasion of Ukraine
Articles containing video clips
Bucha Raion
Child murder during the 2022 Russian invasion of Ukraine
March 2022 crimes in Europe
March 2022 events in Ukraine
Massacres committed by Russia
Massacres in 2022
Massacres in Ukraine
Massacres of Ukrainians
Russian war crimes in Ukraine
War crimes during the 2022 Russian invasion of Ukraine